KASS is a commercial radio station located in Casper, Wyoming, broadcasting on 106.9 FM.  KASS airs a classic rock music format, branded as "Kick 107".  The music programming is syndicated by Westwood One. All Mt. Rushmore Casper stations are located at 218 N. Wolcott in downtown Casper.

History
The station signed on October 15, 1990 as KCSP, a contemporary Christian music radio station. On September 22, 1993, the station changed its call letters to KPGM; the KCSP call letters and the contemporary Christian format moved to 90.3 FM, with KPGM airing religious education programming. In November 1993, the station became "Jukebox 107", an oldies station. The station transitioned into the classic rock format in the fall of 1994. By the beginning of 1995 the station would add hard rock and heavy metal to its playlist. In May 1995, the station changed its name to Kick 107; on May 11, 1995, the station took the KASS call sign.

KASS, along with other Casper stations owned by Mt. Rushmore Broadcasting were fined $68,000 for using unlicensed Studio/transmitter links, which the company had been using for 16 years. The FCC fined the company $68,000 for "willfully and repeatedly" violating the law, giving the stations' owner 30 days to get licenses for its STLs for KASS, and sister stations KMLD, KHOC, and KQLT.
In 2012, station owner Jan Charles Gray was named in a lawsuit by the U.S. Department of Labor for improperly paying employees. Gray called the claims in the lawsuit "bogus".
In 2013, Gray informed the Casper Star Tribune that the lawsuit and a $68,000 fine for unlicensed STLs were "a lot of baloney." Gray said if the FCC doesn't back down, he plans to "sue them on behalf of every radio owner in America that has been wronged by them".

References

External links

ASS
Radio stations established in 1990
Classic rock radio stations in the United States
1990 establishments in Wyoming